This is a list of episodes for The Daily Show with Jon Stewart in 2002.

2002

January

February

March

April

May

June

July

August

September

October

November

December

† These episodes were hosted by Stephen Colbert.

References

 
Daily Show guests
Daily Show guests (2002)